A New England city and town area (NECTA) is a geographic and statistical entity defined by the U.S. federal government for use in the six-state New England region of the United States. NECTAs are analogous to metropolitan statistical areas and micropolitan statistical areas and are defined using the same criteria, except that they are defined on the basis of New England towns instead of entire counties. NECTAs are classified as either metropolitan or micropolitan NECTAs. A micropolitan NECTA has an urban core with a population of at least 10,000 but less than 50,000, whereas a  metropolitan NECTA has an urban core with a population of at least 50,000. 

In New England, towns (which are classified by the United States Census Bureau as minor civil divisions) are a much more important level of government than counties. Because towns are smaller than counties, a NECTA usually provides a much closer approximation to the real metropolitan area than a metropolitan statistical area does.

Large NECTAs (with population greater than 2.5 million) may be subdivided into smaller groupings known as NECTA Divisions. Adjacent NECTAs that have a high degree of employment interchange may also be combined to form Combined NECTAS (or CNECTAs). NECTAs that are part of a CNECTA retain their separate identities.

Lists of NECTAs

Current list

The following is a list of metropolitan and micropolitan NECTAs as defined by the Office of Management and Budget. Definitions are as of September 2018.

Connecticut
Bridgeport-Stamford-Norwalk, CT Metropolitan NECTA
Danbury, CT Metropolitan NECTA
Hartford-East Hartford-Middletown, CT Metropolitan NECTA
New Haven, CT Metropolitan NECTA
Norwich-New London-Westerly, CT-RI Metropolitan NECTA
Torrington, CT Micropolitan NECTA
Waterbury, CT Metropolitan NECTA
Willimantic, CT Micropolitan NECTA

Maine
Augusta, ME Micropolitan NECTA
Bangor, ME Metropolitan NECTA
Brunswick, ME Micropolitan NECTA
Lewiston-Auburn, ME Metropolitan NECTA
Portland-South Portland, ME Metropolitan NECTA
Sanford, ME Micropolitan NECTA
Waterville, ME Micropolitan NECTA

Massachusetts
Athol, MA Micropolitan NECTA
Barnstable Town, MA Metropolitan NECTA
Boston-Cambridge-Newton, MA-NH Metropolitan NECTA
Boston-Cambridge-Newton, MA NECTA Division
Brockton-Bridgewater-Easton, MA NECTA Division
Framingham, MA NECTA Division
Haverhill-Newburyport-Amesbury Town, MA-NH NECTA Division
Lawrence-Methuen Town-North Andover, MA-NH NECTA Division
Lowell-Billerica-Chelmsford, MA-NH NECTA Division
Lynn-Salem-Marblehead, MA NECTA Division
Nashua, NH-MA NECTA Division
Peabody-Beverly-Gloucester, MA NECTA Division
Plymouth-Pembroke-Duxbury, MA NECTA Division
Taunton-Middleborough-Norton, MA NECTA Division
Greenfield Town, MA Micropolitan NECTA
Leominster-Gardner, MA Metropolitan NECTA
New Bedford, MA Metropolitan NECTA
North Adams, MA-VT Micropolitan NECTA
Pittsfield, MA Metropolitan NECTA
Springfield, MA-CT Metropolitan NECTA
Vineyard Haven, MA Micropolitan NECTA
Worcester, MA-CT Metropolitan NECTA

New Hampshire
Berlin, NH Micropolitan NECTA
Claremont, NH Micropolitan NECTA
Concord, NH Micropolitan NECTA
Dover-Durham, NH-ME Metropolitan NECTA
Keene, NH Micropolitan NECTA
Laconia, NH Micropolitan NECTA
Lebanon, NH-VT Micropolitan NECTA
Manchester, NH Metropolitan NECTA
Portsmouth, NH-ME Metropolitan NECTA

Rhode Island
Providence-Warwick, RI-MA Metropolitan NECTA

Vermont
Barre, VT Micropolitan NECTA
Bennington, VT Micropolitan NECTA
Burlington-South Burlington, VT Metropolitan NECTA
Rutland, VT Micropolitan NECTA

Metropolitan NECTAs as of 2010 census

References

External links
Census Bureau maps of NECTAs

United States Census Bureau geography
Metropolitan areas of the United States
City and town area